Mary Poppins 2 may refer to:

 Mary Poppins Comes Back (1935 novel) children's novel by P.L.Travers, second book in the Mary Poppins novel series
 Mary Poppins Returns (2018 film) children's musical film by Walt Disney Studios, second film in the Mary Poppins film series

See also
 Mary Poppins, set index